Clinical Microbiology Reviews is a peer-reviewed medical journal covering the areas of clinical microbiology, immunology, medical microbiology, infectious diseases, veterinary microbiology, and microbial pathogenesis. It is a delayed open access journal, full content is accessible via PubMed Central and the journal's website after a 12-month embargo. In April 2015, the journal transitioned to a continuous online publication model (whereby articles are published as they become ready, before the issue in which they will appear has been finalized). The journal became online-only in January 2018. The final print issue was published in October 2017. According to the Journal Citation Reports, the journal has a 2021 impact factor of 50.129. The journal was established in January 1988. The founding editor was Josephine A. Morello (University of Chicago Medical Center). Editorial board structure changed in 1992 and Morello became editor-in-chief. Betty Ann Forbes (State University of New York) was appointed editor-in-chief in 1997. Irving Nachamkin (University of Pennsylvania) was appointed editor-in-chief in 2002 until 2012. Since 2012, Jo-Anne H. Young (University of Minnesota) has served as editor-in-chief. It is the ninth journal established and published by the American Society for Microbiology.

Abstracting and indexing
The journal is abstracted and indexed in:

According to the Journal Citation Reports, the journal has a 2021 impact factor of 50.129.

See also
Clinical research

References

External links

Microbiology journals
Delayed open access journals
Quarterly journals
English-language journals
Academic journals published by learned and professional societies
Review journals
Publications established in 1988
American Society for Microbiology academic journals